Harry McDonald was an English footballer.

Harry or Harold McDonald may also refer to:

Henry McDonald (engineer), known as Harry, professor of computational engineering
Harry McDonald, architect with his brothers at the firm McDonald Brothers and a Kentucky state legislator
Harold McDonald (footballer, born 1922) (1922–1999), Australian footballer for Carlton
Harold McDonald (footballer, born 1925) (1925–2001), Australian footballer for Port Adelaide

See also
Harry MacDonald (disambiguation)
Henry McDonald (disambiguation)